Guadalupe Victoria Municipality may refer to places in Mexico:
 Guadalupe Victoria Municipality, Durango
 Guadalupe Victoria Municipality, Puebla

Municipality name disambiguation pages